Julianna Joy Zobrist (née Gilmore; born October 5, 1984) is an American Christian musician who performs Christian pop style of electronic dance music. She has released two extended plays, The Tree (2009) and Say It Now (2012), with her first studio album, Shatterproof (2016). The album's two singles, "The Dawn" and "Alive", have charted on the Billboard magazine charts.

Early life
Zobrist was born in Orlando, Florida, on October 5, 1984, as Julianna Joy Gilmore, the daughter of Pastor Jeff and Cheryl Gilmore (née Kauk). She is the fourth child of six. Her elder siblings are Liz, Rosie, and Jeffrey Paul, and her two younger siblings are Caroline and Jonathan. Zobrist was raised in Florida for seven years before her father took a position in Iowa City, Iowa at Parkview Church, while she attended Heritage Christian School. While in high school at Iowa City High School, Zobrist became enamored with fashion. She relocated to Nashville, Tennessee, for her collegiate studies at Belmont University, where she would enroll in the fall of 2003, graduating in May 2007 with her baccalaureate in commercial voice.

Music career
Her music recording career commenced in 2008 with the recording of the extended play The Tree, released on January 8, 2009. She released Say It Now, another extended play, on April 17, 2012. The first studio album, Shatterproof, was released on July 1, 2016. Her two singles from the album, "The Dawn" and "Alive", both charted on the Billboard magazine charts. Her single "The Dawn", peaked at No. 30 on the Christian AC Indicator chart. The second single, "Alive", peaked at No. 48 on the Christian Digital Songs chart. She was named in the top-10 independent artist that should get signed by a major Christian music record label by 365 Days of Inspiring Media. She got to sing the national anthem for the Kansas City Royals, a team for which her husband played, and in 2016, with her husband playing for the Chicago Cubs, she sang "God Bless America" before game 4 at Wrigley Field of the 2016 World Series.

Personal life

Zobrist married Major League Baseball player Ben Zobrist in 2005. They have three children together: a son and two daughters. In May 2019, Ben Zobrist filed for legal separation in Tennessee, citing "inappropriate marital conduct", on the same day that Julianna Zobrist filed for divorce in Illinois. In a deposition for the divorce, Julianna Zobrist admitted to having an affair with the Zobrists' former pastor.

Discography
Studio albums
Shatterproof (July 1, 2016)

EPs
The Tree (January 8, 2009)
Say It Now (April 17, 2012)

References

External links
 

1984 births
Living people
American performers of Christian music
Musicians from Orlando, Florida
People from Iowa City, Iowa
Singer-songwriters from Florida
American women singer-songwriters
American electronic musicians
21st-century American singers
21st-century American women singers
American women in electronic music
Iowa City High School alumni
Singer-songwriters from Iowa